A virtual sit-in is a form of electronic civil disobedience deriving its name from the sit-ins popular during the civil rights movement of the 1960s. The virtual sit-in attempts to recreate that same action digitally using a distributed denial-of-service attack (DDOS). During a virtual sit-in, hundreds of activists attempt to access a target website simultaneously and repetitively. If performed correctly, this will cause the target website to run slowly or even collapse entirely, preventing anyone from accessing it.

Examples 
On December 21, 1995, the first world Virtual sit-in, conceived by Tommaso Tozzi, was created by the Florentine group Strano Network against the French government to protest against the nuclear tests in Mururoa and was defined as a "Netstrike".
On Thursday May 1, 1998, Ricardo Dominguez and Stefan Wray held a virtual sit-in in which they decided to attack the World Economic Forum (WEF). They did this to support their particular beliefs against anti-globalization.  With over 160,000 people who attended the virtual sit-in for reasons that they could not take to the streets of New York City protest. More than 40,000 also downloaded software which made a DDOS attack easier was also recorded. The attack lasted all of Thursday and Friday night.

See also
 Electronic civil disobedience
 Hacktivism

References 

Politics and technology
Civil disobedience
Activism by type